Guram Adzhoyev may refer to:

 Guram Adzhoyev (footballer, born 1961), Russian football player
 Guram Adzhoyev (footballer, born 1995), Russian football player